Gargela subpurella is a moth in the family Crambidae. It was described by Francis Walker in 1864. It is found in Sri Lanka.

References

Crambinae
Moths described in 1864
Moths of Sri Lanka